Ravi Bhollah (born September 28, 1981) is a Mauritian weightlifter who competed in the men's 94 kg category at the 2008 Summer Olympics in Beijing. Bhollah placed thirteenth in his category, by lifting a snatch of 125 kg, and a clean and jerk of 150 kg, with a total of 275 kg. He currently holds the position of National Head Coach of the Mauritius Weightlifting Team. After his career as a Weightlifter in 2011, Ravi Bhollah joined the local club of Highland Blues and started playing Rugby. He played for the Mauritius National Rugby team and represented Mauritius at the Confederation African Cup in 2013, 2014, 2015 and 2016.

References

External links
 
NBC 2008 Olympics profile

1981 births
Living people
Mauritian people of Indian descent
Mauritian male weightlifters
Olympic weightlifters of Mauritius
Weightlifters at the 2008 Summer Olympics
Weightlifters at the 2010 Commonwealth Games
Commonwealth Games competitors for Mauritius